Last stand is a position against overwhelming odds.

Last Stand or The Last Stand may also stand for:

Film and TV

Film
 The Last Stand (1938 film), an American film directed by Joseph H. Lewis
 The Last Stand (1984 film), a film about the band Cold Chisel
 Last Stand, a 2000 science fiction action film with Orestes Matacena
 The Last Stand (2013 film), an action film about an American sheriff who fights against the Mexican drug mafia, starring Arnold Schwarzenegger
 X-Men: The Last Stand, a 2006 film

Television
 "Last Stand" (Stargate SG-1), an episode of the television series Stargate SG-1
 "Last Stand", an episode of the action-adventure television series MacGyver
 "SpongeBob's Last Stand", an episode of the American animated television series SpongeBob SquarePants
"The Last Stand", the fifty-second and final episode of The Legend of Korra
"The Last Stand, Part 1" and "2", the fifty-ninth and sixtieth episodes of Voltron: Legendary Defender

Music
 The Last Stand (Boot Camp Clik album), an album by Boot Camp Clik 2006
 The Last Stand  (Sabaton album), an album by Swedish power-metal band Sabaton 2016
 "Last stand", song by Adelitas Way from Adelitas Way

Other uses
 Custer's Last Stand, also known as the Battle of the Little Bighorn, a battle in 1876
 The Last Stand, a gameplay mode for the video game Warhammer 40,000: Dawn of War II
 The Last Stand, a DLC campaign for the video game Left 4 Dead 2.